Kuwait Liberation Medal may refer to:

Kuwait Liberation Medal (Kuwait)
Kuwait Liberation Medal (Saudi Arabia)
Medal for the Liberation of Kuwait (Bahrain), see Gulf War military awards#Medal for the Liberation of Kuwait (Bahrain)
Kuwait Liberation Medal (Egypt), see Gulf War military awards#Kuwait Liberation Medal (Egypt)
Medal for the Liberation of Kuwait (United Arab Emirates), see Gulf War military awards#Medal for the Liberation of Kuwait (United Arab Emirates)

See also
Gulf War Military Awards